Zhongshan Park is a common name for Chinese parks, in honour of Sun Yat-sen, better-known in Chinese as Sun Zhongshan, who is considered by many to be the "Father of modern China". Currently there are more than 40 Zhongshan Parks in China, and some in overseas areas.

List of Zhongshan Parks

 People's Republic of China
 Nanjing Zhongshan Park, Nanjing, containing the Sun Yat-sen Mausoleum.
 Zhongshan Sun Wen Memorial Park, Zhongshan (Sun Yat-sen's birthplace, later renamed after him)
 Beijing Zhongshan Park, Beijing
 Shanghai Zhongshan Park, Shanghai
 Shenyang Zhongshan Park, Shenyang
 Jinan Zhongshan Park, Jinan
 Memorial Park of Dr. Sun Yat Sen, Macau
 Ningbo Zhongshan Park, Ningbo
 Dalian Zhongshan Park, Dalian
 Qingdao Zhongshan Park, Qingdao
 Hangzhou Zhongshan Park, Hangzhou
 Wuhan Zhongshan Park, Wuhan
 Xiamen Zhongshan Park, Xiamen
 Shantou Zhongshan Park, Shantou
 Shenzhen Zhongshan Park, Shenzhen
 Foshan Zhongshan Park, Foshan
 Huizhou Zhongshan Park, Huizhou
 Wuzhou Zhongshan Park, Wuzhou
 People's Park (Ürümqi), formerly Zhongshan Park
 Republic of China (Taiwan)
 Sun Yat-sen Memorial Hall with attached Memorial Park, Taipei
 Hsinchu Sun Yat-sen Park, Hsinchu
 Tainan Sun Yat-sen Park, Tainan
 Taichung Sun Yat-sen Park, Taichung
 Chiayi Sun Yat-sen Park, Chiayi
 Yilan Chongshan Park, Yilan
 Chongshan Memorial Park, Kinmen
 Luodong Chongshan Park, Luodong, Yilan County
 Hong Kong
 Sun Yat Sen Memorial Park (formerly Western Park), Sai Ying Pun, Victoria City
 Hung Lau, Tuen Mun, New Territories
 Canada
 Parc Sun Yat-sen, Montréal, Québec
 Dr. Sun Yat-Sen Classical Chinese Garden, Vancouver, British Columbia
 Singapore
 Zhongshan Park

References

See also
Zhongshan Road

Parks in China
Sun Yat-sen
Parks in Taiwan